Blanco y Negro Music (short Blanco y Negro translated from Spanish "Black and White") is a Spanish record label which was founded in 1978. It is one of the leading dance music record companies in Spain. On January 17, 1983, Blanco y Negro Music became a record label, founded by Félix Buget. It is considered by the media as the pioneer of EDM in Spain.

The company is also specialized in film and video productions. It presents artists, like Pitbull, Shaggy, DJ BoBo, SASH! and Guru Josh.

Blanco y Negro Music is a partner of the enterprise Pulsive Media in Burgwedel in Germany.

See also 
 List of record labels

References

External links 
 http://blancoynegro.com/
 
 

Spanish record labels
Record labels established in 1978
House music record labels
Electronic music record labels
Pop record labels
1978 establishments in Spain